Lucía Falasca (born 8 July 1993) is an Argentine competitive sailor.

She competed at the 2016 Summer Olympics in Rio de Janeiro, in the women's Laser Radial. She finished in 11th place.

She qualified to represent Argentina at the 2020 Summer Olympics.

References

External links

1993 births
Living people
Argentine female sailors (sport)
Olympic sailors of Argentina
Sailors at the 2016 Summer Olympics – Laser Radial
Sailors at the 2020 Summer Olympics – Laser Radial
Pan American Games medalists in sailing
Pan American Games bronze medalists for Argentina
Sailors at the 2015 Pan American Games
Sailors at the 2019 Pan American Games
Medalists at the 2019 Pan American Games
Sportspeople from Buenos Aires